The cinnamon ibon (Hypocryptadius cinnamomeus) is a species of bird endemic to the mountains of Mindanao in the Philippines. Monotypic within the genus Hypocryptadius, it is classified as an old world sparrow Its natural habitat is tropical moist montane forests and mossy forests above .

Description and Taxonomy 

EBird describes the bird as "A fairly small to medium-sized bird . Bright cinnamon on the crown and back with darker wings and tail, a pale orange throat, chest, and sides, and white on the belly and under the base of the tail. Note the red eye and the silver-gray legs and bill. Often found in mixed-species flocks. No similar species in range. Voice is a mixture of high-pitched squeals, a sharp nasal “wik,” and a forceful, medium-pitched “piii! piuu-piuu!” with the final notes downslurred."

Monotypic within the genus Hypocryptadius, it is classified as a sparrow after being tentatively placed in the white-eye family Zosteropidae. It has a skull and bill similar to that of the sparrows, and following a study of its mitochondrial and nuclear DNA as well as skeletal evidence, Jon Fjeldså and colleagues placed the species as the most basal member of that family and a distinct subfamily.

Habitat and Conservation Status 
Its habitat is in tropical moist montane and sub-montane mossy forests and forest edge above 1,000 meters above sea level.

IUCN has assessed this bird as a least-concern species . While it has a limited range, is supposedly common in areas it is found.however the population is said to be decreasing. This is due to habitat loss due to legal and illegal logging, mining and conversion into farmlands through Slash-and-burn or other methods.

References

External links
Cinnamon Ibon media on the Internet Bird Collection
Video of a Cinnamon Ibon nesting
Article on the Cinnamon Ibon by Don Roberson

cinnamon ibon
Birds of Mindanao
Endemic birds of the Philippines
cinnamon ibon
Taxonomy articles created by Polbot